This is the discography of British folk rock band Steeleye Span.

Albums

Studio

Live

Compilation

Box sets

Home video

EPs

Singles

Notes

References

Discographies of British artists
Rock music group discographies
Folk music discographies